Domingo Gribeo y Martin (1558–1649) was a Spanish military man who served during the Viceroyalty of Peru as mayordomo of hospital, and regidor of Buenos Aires.

Biography 

Gribeo was born in Asuncion, son of Leonardo Gribeo and Isabel Martín, daughter of Manuel Martin, a Spanish conquistador who served as notary public of Asuncion. Domingo Gribeo was married to María Esterlín, daughter of Rodrigo de Esterlín and Juana de Solórzano, belonging to Creole families, among whose many ancestors were the conquerors Arnao Esterlin and Zoilo de Solórzano, born in the Islas Canarias. 
 
Domingo had inherited the land from his brother Lazaro Gribeo, neighbor founder of Buenos Aires, companion of Juan de Garay in the second foundation of the city.

References

External links 
biblioteca.clarin.com

1558 births
1649 deaths
People from Buenos Aires
People from Asunción
Spanish colonial governors and administrators
Paraguayan Christians
Paraguayan military personnel
Paraguayan politicians